This is a listing of notable people who were born in, or have lived in, Flagstaff, Arizona. People whose only association with Flagstaff is attending, playing at, or coaching at Northern Arizona University should not be listed. For people who attended NAU see List of Northern Arizona University alumni.

Arts and entertainment
 Ted Danson – actor (Originally from San Diego, California)
 Andy Devine – actor
 R. Carlos Nakai – Native American flutist
 James Neilson – director (Originally from Shreveport, Louisiana
 Katie Pavlich – journalist, author (Originally from Phoenix, Arizona)
 Klinton Spilsbury – actor (Originally from Chihuahua City, Mexico)

Literature
 Harvey Butchart – author, mathematician
 Ann Cummins – author (Originally from Durango, Colorado)
 Diana Gabaldon – author (Originally from Scottsdale, Arizona)

Military
 Amir Mirza Hekmati – U.S. Marine held prisoner by Iran for spying while visiting his grandmother

Politics

 Henry F. Ashurst – one of Arizona's first two Senators (Originally from Winnemucca, Nevada)
 Bruce Babbitt – former governor, and former United States Secretary of the Interior
 Paul Gosar – House of Representatives (Originally from Rock Springs, Wyoming)
 Ann Kirkpatrick – House of Representatives (Originally from McNary, Arizona)
 Ned Norris Jr. – chairman of the Tohono O'odham Nation
 Adam Perez Diaz – the first Hispanic to serve as Vice-Mayor of Phoenix.
 Rick Renzi – House of Representatives (Originally from Fort Monmouth, New Jersey)
 John Verkamp – state representative (Originally from Grand Canyon Village, Arizona)

Science and medicine
 William J. Breed – geologist, paleontologist, naturalist, author (Originally from Massillon, Ohio)
 Edwin H. Colbert – paleontologist, author (Originally from Clarinda, Iowa)
 Grady Gammage – educator, president ASU and NAU (Originally from Prescott, Arkansas)
 E. S. Gosney – eugenicist (Originally from Kenton County, Kentucky)
 Percival Lowell – astronomer, businessman, author (Originally from Boston, Massachusetts)
 Harold Masursky – geologist, astronomer (Originally from Fort Wayne, Indiana)
 Dale Shewalter – educator, outdoorsman (Originally from Geneva, Illinois)
 Eugene Merle Shoemaker – geologist, one of the founders of the field of planetary science, co-discoverer of Comet Shoemaker–Levy 9 (Originally from Los Angeles, California)
 Earl C. Slipher – astronomer, Mayor of Flagstaff (Originally from Mulberry, Indiana)
 Vesto Slipher – astronomer (Originally from Mulberry, Indiana)
 Clyde Tombaugh – astronomer, discoverer of Pluto (Originally from Streator, Illinois)

Sports

 Trent Bray – professional football player
 Tracy Grose – professional soccer player, college soccer coach (Originally from St. Charles, Missouri)
 Donnie Hickman – professional football player
 Kyle Lobstein – professional baseball pitcher
 Guor Marial – marathon runner (Originally from Unity, South Sudan)
 Eric McCain – professional football player
 Max Settlage – pair figure skater (Originally from Thừa Thiên–Huế Province, Vietnam)

References

 
Flagstaff
Flagstaff, Arizona